Higashiyama (東山) is a Japanese surname. People with the surname include:

 Kaii Higashiyama (1908–1999), Japanese painter and writer
 Noriyuki Higashiyama (born 1966), Japanese singer and actor
 Chieko Higashiyama (1890–1980), Japanese stage and film actress
 Tatsuki Higashiyama (born 1999), Japanese soccer player
 Mami Higashiyama (born 1977), Japanese actress and singer
 Hideo Higashiyama (born 1942), Japanese sprint canoer

See also 
 Emperor Higashiyama, 113th Emperor of Japan